The Pittsburgh and West Virginia Railway  was a railroad in the Pittsburgh, Pennsylvania and Wheeling, West Virginia, areas. Originally built as the Wabash Pittsburgh Terminal Railway, a Pittsburgh extension of George J. Gould's Wabash Railroad, the venture entered receivership in 1908 and the line was cut loose. An extension completed in 1931 connected it to the Western Maryland Railway at Connellsville, Pennsylvania, forming part of the Alphabet Route, a coalition of independent lines between the Northeastern United States and the Midwest. It was leased by the Norfolk and Western Railway in 1964 in conjunction with the N&W acquiring several other sections of the former Alphabet Route, but was leased to the new spinoff Wheeling and Lake Erie Railway in 1990, just months before the N&W was merged into the Norfolk Southern Railway.

The original Wabash Pittsburgh Terminal Railway built several massive engineering works, including the Wabash Terminal in downtown Pittsburgh, damaged by two fires in 1946 and demolished in 1953. The Wabash Bridge over the Monongahela River into Pittsburgh was torn down in 1948, and on December 27, 2004, the Wabash Tunnel just southwest of the bridge opened as a high occupancy vehicle roadway through Mount Washington. As of January 2020 the two piers of the long-gone Wabash Bridge remain standing.

The line also had a branch to West End, Pennsylvania, that was abandoned in 2011, and a branch to West Mifflin, Pennsylvania, known as the Mifflin Branch. And it also has a small industrial branch located near Belle Vernon, Pennsylvania.

History

Gould system: 1901 to 1908
Around 1900 George J. Gould was assembling railroads to create a transcontinental system. The Western Pacific Railway, Denver and Rio Grande Railroad and Missouri Pacific Railroad formed the line from the Pacific Ocean at San Francisco to the Mississippi River at St. Louis (completed in 1909). Past St. Louis, Gould acquired the Wabash Railroad to Toledo.

On February 1, 1901 Gould, along with Joseph Ramsey, Jr., of the Wabash and others, formed the Pittsburgh-Toledo Syndicate, a syndicate intending to extend the system to Pittsburgh. The next month, the syndicate bought the Pittsburgh and Mansfield Railroad, an unbuilt line with a charter to build into downtown Pittsburgh. By May 1 the syndicate gained control of the Wheeling and Lake Erie Railroad, extending the system from Toledo southeast to Zanesville, Ohio and Wheeling, West Virginia.

The extension to Pittsburgh was chartered in three parts—the Cross Creek Railroad April 23, 1900 in Ohio, Pittsburgh, Toledo and Western Railroad April 3, 1901 in West Virginia, and Pittsburgh, Carnegie and Western Railroad July 17, 1901, in Pennsylvania. Work on the line, branching off the P&WV's line to Wheeling at Pittsburgh Junction, Ohio, began June 14, 1901. On May 7, 1904, the three companies were consolidated into the Wabash Pittsburgh Terminal Railway, to which all the properties of the syndicate (including the W&LE) were transferred. The first train passed through the Wabash Tunnel and crossed the |Wabash Bridge over the Monongahela River into Pittsburgh on June 1, and passenger service into the new Wabash Terminal began July 2, with through service over the W&LE and Wabash to Toledo, Chicago, St. Louis and Kansas City.

In addition to the Pittsburgh extension Gould planned a line from Zanesville southeast to Belington, West Virginia, built by the Little Kanawha Syndicate. From Belington east to tidewater in Baltimore, the Fuller Syndicate bought the West Virginia Central and Pittsburg Railway and a controlling interest in the Western Maryland Railroad in 1902. Another part of the plan was the Philadelphia and Western Railway, a high-speed third rail electric interurban line, which would have run from Philadelphia west to the Western Maryland at York, Pennsylvania. The lines of the Fuller Syndicate were completed to Baltimore, but the Little Kanawha line was not completed and a connection between the main system and the Fuller Syndicate was not built.

As Gould's plans affected the Pennsylvania Railroad's business, PRR took measures to fight back. This included the eviction from PRR property of telegraph poles owned by Gould's Western Union.

The Panic of 1907 hit Gould hard, due to the high costs of building the line when all the easy routes had been taken, and the Western Maryland Railroad was the first of his properties to fail, entering receivership on March 5, 1908. The Wabash Pittsburgh Terminal Railway entered receivership May 29 of that year, ending through traffic between Pittsburgh and the W&LE and Wabash system.

Independence: 1908 to 1929
After years of operation by its receivers, the company was finally sold at foreclosure in August 1916 and reorganized November as the Pittsburgh and West Virginia Railway. The line was again being considered for part of a major system—the "Fifth System" to supplement the four major players, the Pennsylvania Railroad, New York Central Railroad, Baltimore and Ohio Railroad and Erie Railroad—but there was still the issue of the gap between the W&LE/P&WV and the Western Maryland, never filled by the Little Kanawha Syndicate.

The existing West Side Belt Railroad provided for the beginning of this extension, crossing the P&WV at the southwest portal of the Wabash Tunnel under Mount Washington and running southeast and east to Clairton on the Monongahela River. After an initial denial, the Interstate Commerce Commission approved the P&WV's plan to acquire the West Side Belt in December 1928.

Pennsylvania Railroad influence: 1929 to 1964
In 1929, the Pennsylvania Railroad incorporated the Pennroad Corporation as an investment and holding company. This allowed the PRR to indirectly invest in other transportation companies without ICC regulation. Among the initial purchases, 72% of the P&WV was acquired.

On February 11, 1931, the extension to Connellsville, Pennsylvania opened, where the Western Maryland continued east, splitting from the West Side Belt at Pierce. This formed what came to be known as the Alphabet Route, following roughly the same plan as Gould's system, but using the Nickel Plate Road rather than the Wabash to reach both St. Louis and Chicago. The P&WV and Western Maryland never actually physically connected to one another in Connellsville—a short section of Pittsburgh and Lake Erie Railroad trackage was used to connect the P&WV to the WM.

The Nickel Plate leased the Wheeling and Lake Erie on December 1, 1949. In March 1950, the Pennroad announced plans to lease the P&WV to the Nickel Plate. In 1962, the Norfolk & Western Railway filed to include the P&WV in the upcoming merger of the Nickel Plate. On October 16, 1964, the Norfolk and Western acquired the Nickel Plate and leased the P&WV. On the other hand, the Western Maryland Railway eventually went to the competing Baltimore and Ohio Railroad and Chesapeake and Ohio Railway in 1967. Following the abandonment of the Western Maryland Railway mainline from Connellsville to Cumberland, Maryland, in 1975, a connection was established between the P&WV and the B&O at a location near Connellsville called Sodem, and the P&WV's connection to the P&LE and WM was abandoned at this same time. This enabled a semblance of the old Alphabet Route to continue under the Chessie System, although on B&O lines east from Connellsville instead of WM lines.

Norfolk and Western: 1964 to 1990

The Pittsburgh and West Virginia Railroad was organized in 1967 as a real estate investment trust to own the property leased to the N&W. The railroad is now a subsidiary of Power REIT, real estate investment trust that is publicly traded on the NYSE under the symbol "PW". The leased properties consist of a railroad line 112 miles in length, extending from Connellsville, Washington, and Allegheny Counties in the Commonwealth of Pennsylvania; Brooke County in the State of West Virginia, and Jefferson and Harrison Counties in Ohio. There are also branch lines that total 20 miles in length located in Washington County and Allegheny County in Pennsylvania and Brooke County, West Virginia. The railroad was leased in 1964 to NSC, formerly Norfolk and Western Railway Company, by the Company's predecessor for 99 years with the right of unlimited renewal for additional 99-year period under the same terms and conditions, including annual rent payments.

The lease provides that NSC at its own expense and without deduction from the rent, will maintain, manage and operate the leased property and make such improvements thereto as it considers desirable. Such improvements made by NSC become the property of the Pittsburgh & West Virginia Railroad, and the cost thereof constitutes a recorded indebtedness of the Company to NSC.

The Company's business consists solely of the ownership of the properties subject to the lease, and of collection of rent thereon. Upon termination of the lease, all properties covered by the lease would be returned to Pittsburgh & West Virginia Railroad, together with sufficient cash and other assets to permit operation of the railroad for one year.

Wheeling and Lake Erie: 1990 to present
On May 17, 1990, Norfolk Southern spun off most of the former W&LE as a new Wheeling and Lake Erie Railway. The P&WV lease was transferred to the new W&LE, which has also acquired trackage rights over CSX Transportation lines from Connellsville east to Hagerstown, Maryland.

References

Further reading

 Baer, Christopher T. "PRR Chronology" Excerpted from "A General Chronology of the Pennsylvania Railroad Company Predecessors and Successors and Its Historical Context". Pennsylvania Railroad Technical and Historical Society. Accessed 2009-12-14.
 Earlpleasants.com. "Railroad History Database"

External links

 Pittsburgh and West Virginia Railway Company Drawings, 1948-1950 Archives Center, National Museum of American History, Smithsonian Institution
The P&WV Hi-Line Historic photos, past company newsletters and documents, maps and discussion board
Alphabet Route - Pittsburgh & West Virginia Railway History

 
Predecessors of the Norfolk and Western Railway
Railway companies established in 1916
Railway companies disestablished in 1967
Defunct Ohio railroads
Defunct Pennsylvania railroads
Defunct West Virginia railroads
Wabash Railroad
Former Class I railroads in the United States
Transportation in Pittsburgh
American companies established in 1893
Railway companies established in 1893
American companies disestablished in 1967